Mark Philippoussis was the defending champion and successfully defended his title, by defeating Mikael Tillström 7–5, 4–6, 6–3 in the final.

Seeds

Draw

Finals

Top half

Bottom half

External links
 Official results archive (ATP)
 Official results archive (ITF)

SAP Open
2000 ATP Tour